Dhitpur Union is a union parishad under Bhaluka Upazila of Mymensingh District in the division of Mymensingh, Bangladesh.

Demographics 
According to the National Bureau of Statistics of Bangladesh census report, the number of population was 22,009 in 2011.

References 

Unions of Bhaluka Upazila